Fontaine's Landing is an unincorporated area in geographic Hanlan Township, Cochrane District in Northeastern Ontario, Canada.

References

Other map sources:

Communities in Cochrane District